Hail Social was a rock band from Philadelphia.

A post on the band's blog on Thursday, June 18, 2009 stated that Hail Social is "no longer an active band and has not been for years now." 

While active, the band released several self-made EPs at their concerts, sometimes referred to by color. In April, 2005, Dine Alone Productions pressed Hail Social's first 7-inch, a limited edition single release. Their debut self-titled album was released by Polyvinyl Records in August, 2005, and their Warning Sign 7-inch came out in March, 2006, also on Polyvinyl.  Their second album titled Modern Love & Death was self-released on March 20, 2007.

The band toured with Interpol and The Secret Machines in the Fall of 2004. They then toured the UK with The Ordinary Boys in the Autumn of 2005. 

Founder Dayve Hawk now records original electronic music and remixes as Memory Tapes.

External links
 Official Site
 Philadelphia Weekly Review
  indieworkshop.com article

Rock music groups from Pennsylvania
Musical groups from Philadelphia
Polyvinyl Record Co. artists